Trans-Sumatra Toll Road is an under-construction tolled expressway stretching across Sumatra Island in Indonesia from the northern tip of Banda Aceh to the southern tip of Bakauheni. This toll road was originally planned to connect to the established toll road system of Java through the now cancelled Sunda Strait Bridge. The toll road is to include supporting corridors connecting the cities of Padang, Bengkulu, and Sibolga on the western coast of the island to the main corridors stretching across the more populated eastern coast. State construction company Hutama Karya has been given a government-granted monopoly to operate the network.

The toll's entire length of  will cost an estimated Rp476 trillion (US$33.2 billion) and consist of seventeen main segments and seven supporting segments. The toll road is expected to be completed by 2024. As of October 2022,  of the road were completed and operational.

Main corridors
Total length of the main corridors are estimated to be , consisting of:

 Banda Aceh–Medan.
 Medan–Pekanbaru.
 Pekanbaru–Palembang (610 km).
 Palembang–Lampung.

List of completed and under-construction segments 
1. Bakauheni–Terbanggi Besar. Formally opened on March 8, 2019.

2. Terbanggi Besar–Pematang Panggang–Kayu Agung (189.2 km). Currently the longest toll road in Indonesia. Formally opened on November 15, 2019.

3. Kayu Agung–Palembang–Betung Toll Road. Section I, which is 33.5 km in length is operational since April 1, 2020. The remaining sections are under-construction.

4. Pekanbaru–Dumai Set to be completed in June 2020. The toll road was inaugurated by Indonesian President Joko Widodo on 25 September 2020.

5. Kuala Tanjung–Tebing Tinggi–Pematang Siantar–Parapat.

6. Medan–Kualanamu–Tebing Tinggi Formally opened on March 24, 2019.

7. Medan–Binjai Section II and III started operation on October 13, 2017.

8. Sigli–Banda Aceh Toll Road Section IV was inaugurated in August 2020. Section III in December 2020. Section I, II, V, and VI in 2021.

List of planned segments 
1.Betung–Jambi (168 km).

2.Jambi-Rengat.

3.Rengat–Pekanbaru.

4.Dumai–Rantau Prapat.

5.Rantau Prapat–Kisaran.

6.Kisaran-Indrapura.

7.Binjai–Langsa.

8.Langsa–Lhokseumawe.

9.Lhokseumawe–Sigli.

Supporting corridors
Total length of the supporting corridors are 770 km, consisting of:

 Palembang–Bengkulu.
 Pekanbaru–Padang.
 Medan–Sibolga.

List of completed and under-construction segments 
1. Palembang–Indralaya Toll Road. All Sections are operational in 2018, followed by KTM exit in 2019.

2. Lubuk Linggau–Curup–Bengkulu.

3. Padang–Bukittinggi–Pekanbaru.

4. Indralaya–Muara Enim

List of planned segments 

1. Muara Enim–Lubuk Linggau

2. Sibolga–Parapat

Progress and completion
Ground-breaking of the toll road was held on October 10, 2014. These include Bakauheni–Terbanggi Besar, Terbanggi Besar–Pematang Panggang–Kayu Agung, Palembang–Indralaya, Medan–Kualanamu–Tebing Tinggi, Medan–Binjai Section 2 and 3, and Belawan–Medan–Tanjung Morawa. While the functional segment is Kayu Agung–Palembang–Betung Section I

Progress table 

Construction progress sourced from BPJT

See also 

 Trans-Java Toll Road (Java)

References

Notes

External links 
 Progress

Toll roads in Indonesia
Proposed transport infrastructure in Indonesia